Robert J. Letourneau is a Republican former member of the New Hampshire Senate, representing the 19th District starting in 2004 and ending in 2010. Previously he was a member of the New Hampshire House of Representatives from 1996 until 2004.

External links
The New Hampshire Senate - Senator Robert J. Letourneau official government website
Project Vote Smart - Senator Robert J. 'Bob' Letourneau (NH) profile
Follow the Money - Bob Letourneau
2006 20042002 2000 1998 campaign contributions

Republican Party New Hampshire state senators
Republican Party members of the New Hampshire House of Representatives
1942 births
Living people